The  is a traditional Korean wig worn by women. Historically,  were expensive accessories worn only by women of high social standing, alongside . They were decorated with silk objects, gold, jewels, silver, coral, jade, and other expensive materials. Certain decorations were reserved for royalty.

History
Historically, women of high social backgrounds and  wore , with larger and heavier wigs considered to be more aesthetically pleasing. Due to the expense of purchasing a new , some lower-class families took up to 6–7 years preparing a new  wig for their new daughter-in-law.

However,  still enjoyed vast popularity in  circles and traditional weddings.

Gallery

See also

References

External links

 Brief information about 

Korean headgear
Wigs
Hairdressing